Bohtan Neo-Aramaic is a dialect of Northeastern Neo-Aramaic originally spoken by ethnic Assyrians on the plain of Bohtan in the Ottoman Empire. Its speakers were displaced during the Assyrian genocide in 1915 and settled in Gardabani, near Rustavi in Georgia, Göygöl and Ağstafa in Azerbaijan. However it is now spoken in Moscow, Krymsk and Novopavlosk, Russia. It is considered to be a dialect of Assyrian Neo-Aramaic since it is a northeastern Aramaic language and its speakers are ethnically Assyrians.

The closest related dialect is Hertevin, and Bohtan also shares many similarities with the peripheral Qaraqosh dialect.

Genealogy 
This dialect is derived from the Northeastern Neo-Aramaic (NENA) languages, which is made up by Bohtan Neo-Aramaic, Assyrian Neo-Aramaic, Chaldean Neo-Aramaic, Hertevin, Senaya and Koy Sanjat Surat. Bohtan refers to the area between the Tigris and Bohtan river . The dialect mostly spoken by Christian communities.

The Neo-Aramaic language is classified under Afroasiatic and the Bohtan dialect is more specifically one of the NENA dialects which are found south-eastern Turkey, northern Iraq and western Iran  Due to the dislocation of NENA speakers, neighboring languages have influenced the dialects, such as Kurdish.

Phonology
Bohtan's consonant inventory is typical of other NENA dialects. Unlike Hertevin, it merges /ħ/ and /x/ into /x/.

Status 
Bohtan Neo-Aramaic is considered as a severely endangered language as it is estimated to have less than 500 speakers, mostly found in the former Soviet Union. Due to migration and intermarriage, younger generations speak the language less fluently and are expected to know Russian or Turkish as their first language.

See also 
 Assyria
 Assyrian people
 Aramaic language
 Assyrian Church of the East
 Assyrian Neo-Aramaic
 Chaldean Neo-Aramaic
 Turoyo
 Syriac language
 Syriac alphabet

References

Further reading 
 Heinrichs, Wolfhart. 1990. "Studies in Neo-Aramaic. Scholars Press: Atlanta, Georgia..
 Maclean, Arthur John. 1895: "Grammar of the dialects of vernacular Syriac: as spoken by the Eastern Syrians of Kurdistan, north-west Persia, and the Plain of Mosul: with notices of the vernacular of the Jews of Azerbaijan and of Zakhu near Mosul. Cambridge University Press: London.
 Greenfield, Jonas. 1978. “The Dialects of Early Aramaic". Journal of Near Eastern Studies, Colloquium on Aramaic Studies 37: 93-99
Fox, Samuel. 2002. "A Neo-Aramaic Dialect of Bohtan", in W. Arnold and H. Bobzin, „Sprich doch mit deinen Knechten aramäisch, wir verstehen es!“ 60 Beiträge zur Semitistik Festschrift für Otto Jastrow zum 60. Geburtstag, Wiesbaden: Harrassowitz 165–180.
Takashina, Yoshiyuki.1990. "Some Remarks on Modern Aramaic of Hertevin." Journal of Asian and African Studies 40: 85-132
Jastrow, Otto. 1988. "Der neuaramäische Dialekt von Hertevin" (Provinz Siirt). Wiesbaden:L Harrassowitz.

External links 
 Bohtan Neo-Aramaic at the Endangered Languages Project
 Numbers in Bohtan Neo-Aramaic

Central Semitic languages
Eastern Aramaic languages
Christian Northeastern Neo-Aramaic dialects
Languages of Russia
Languages of Georgia (country)
Endangered Afroasiatic languages
Languages of Kurdistan